Mark Boyer (born September 16, 1962) is a former American football tight end.

High school career
Boyer prepped at Edison High School in Huntington Beach.

College career
Boyer played college football at the University of Southern California

Mark graduated from the University of Southern California (USC) in 1985 with a B.S. degree in Business Administration and an emphasis in Finance. While at USC, Mark was a four-year letterman in football helping lead the way to a Pac.10 Championship in 1984 and a win over Ohio State in the 1985 Rose Bowl.  Awards while at USC include member of the 1984 Pac-10 All-Academic Team, Three time recipient of the David X. Marks Foundations "Scholar Athlete Award of Honor," and the John Wayne Memorial Scholarship.  He also was very involved with Athletes in Action helping start a chapel program at USC.

Professional career
Boyer played Tight End, from 1985–1992, for the NFL teams Indianapolis Colts and New York Jets.

In 1985, Mark was drafted by the Indianapolis Colts as a tight end and played for the Colts for 5 years.  In 1990, he signed with the New York Jets as a free agent and played another 3 years.  Mark was known as a "prolific blocker," helping Eric Dickerson lead the NFL in rushing in 1988 and the Jets to be a Top 5 NFL Rushing Team in 1990 and 1991.  Solid hands helped him catch 170 passes for over 1,500 yards and 6 touchdowns through 114 career games. After 8 seasons in the NFL, Mark retired in 1994 due to a back injury.

References

1962 births
Living people
Sportspeople from Huntington Beach, California
Players of American football from California
Marshall School of Business alumni
USC Trojans football players
Indianapolis Colts players
New York Jets players